KKVV (1060 AM) is a radio station broadcasting a religious radio format. Licensed to Las Vegas, Nevada, United States, it serves the Las Vegas area.  The station is currently owned by Las Vegas Broadcasters and features programming from Salem Communications.

History
The station began broadcasting in May 1990 and primarily focused on airing brokered Christian talk and teaching programs with music. By 1994, about six hours of each day's 14 hours of broadcasting was locally produced.

To prevent interference to Los Angeles station KNX, a 50,000 watt clear-channel station on adjacent channel 1070, KKVV lowers its power significantly at sunset.

References

External links

KVV
Radio stations established in 1990
KVV
1990 establishments in Nevada